Andrés López may refer to:

 Andrés López Forero (born 1971), Colombian comedian and actor
 Andrés W. López, Puerto Rico member of the Democratic National Committee
 Andrés Manuel López Obrador (born 1953), Mexican politician, serving as president of the country since 2018
 Andrés López (badminton) (born 1992), Mexican badminton player
 Andrés López (footballer) (born 1993), Ecuadorian footballer